North Dam is an earth-fill embankment dam near the town of Grand Coulee in Grant County, Washington, United States. Construction of the dam began in 1946 and it was completed in 1951. The lake serves as the equalizer reservoir of the Columbia Basin Project. Near the North Dam's left abutment is the entrance to the feeder canal of the project. The canal serves to either deliver water to the Pump-generating plant at Grand Coulee Dam or return water to Banks Lake from the same pumped-storage plant.

Both North and Dry Falls dams have  of freeboard for protection against wave action due to high winds.

External links
Columbia Basin Project

References

Dams in Washington (state)
Buildings and structures in Grant County, Washington
United States Bureau of Reclamation dams
Dams completed in 1951
Earth-filled dams
1951 establishments in Washington (state)
Dams in the Columbia Basin